Sami Mubarak Faraj Ba Owain (born 12 November 1991), commonly known as Sami Mubarak, is an Omani footballer who plays for Dhofar S.C.S.C. in the Oman Professional League.

Club career
On 7 July 2014, he signed a one-year contract with Dhofar S.C.S.C.

Club career statistics

International career
Sami is part of the first team squad of the Oman national football team. He was selected for the national team for the first time in 2012. He made his first appearance for Oman  on 8 December 2012 against Lebanon in the 2012 WAFF Championship. He has made appearances in the 2012 WAFF Championship and the 2014 WAFF Championship.

Honours

Club
With Dhofar
Oman Professional League Cup (0): Runner-up 2014–15
Baniyas SC International Tournament (1): Winner 2014

References

External links
 
 
 
 

1991 births
Living people
People from Salalah
Omani footballers
Oman international footballers
Association football defenders
Salalah SC players
Al-Nasr SC (Salalah) players
Dhofar Club players
Oman Professional League players